TV Prijedor or Televizija Prijedor is a local Bosnian  public television channel based in Prijedor municipality. It was established in 2000 as ТВ Приједор. Program is mainly produced in Serbian from 6 pm to midnight.

Radio Prijedor and local newspapers Kozarski Vjesnik are also part of public municipality services.

References

External links 
 Website of CRA BiH

Television channels and stations established in 2000
Television stations in Bosnia and Herzegovina